The Act 23 & 24 Vict c 151, sometimes called the Mines Regulation Act 1860, the Mines Act 1860, the Inspection of Mines Act 1860, the Regulation and Inspection of Mines Act 1860, the Coal Mines Act 1860, the Coal Mines Regulation Act 1860, the Inspection and Regulation of Coal Mines Act 1860, or the Inspection of Coal Mines Act, is an Act of the Parliament of the United Kingdom that raised the age of children working in coal mines from 10 to 12 years of age. There were exceptions if the boys could read and write or attended school for six hours per week. The Act also improved safety rules.

Background

During the Victorian era, there was concern about working conditions for women and children in mills, factories, workshops, and particularly in coal mines. A Report by a Royal commission, conducted in 1842 showed that there were children eight years of age and younger who were employed in the mines. In eastern Scotland, there were both girls and boys who worked in the mines. There were also women who worked in mines. The key finding was that mine owners were not concerned about the working conditions, which were found to be degrading.

In 1842, the Mines and Collieries Bill was passed in Parliament to prevent girls and women from working underground and placed a minimum age of ten for boys. Anthony Ashley-Cooper supported the bill. Due to the number of accidents in coal mines, the Coal Mines Inspection Act of 1850 mandated the appointment of coal mine inspectors who reported to the Home Office. The Act stipulated the inspector's responsibilities and powers. The legislation focused on improving ventilation, lighting, and workers' safety.

Legislation
One hundred and fourteen men and boys were killed on 15 July 1856 as the result of the Cymmer Colliery explosion at the Old Pit mine of the Cymmer Colliery near Porth, Wales. The underground explosion of gas resulted in a "sacrifice of human life to an extent unparalleled in the history of coal mining of this country".

The Coal Mines Regulation Act of 1860 raised the minimum age for male coal mine workers to 12 years of age, from ten. It did allow a provision for boys between ten and twelve years of age to work at the mines under two conditions. One was that they could read and write, as documented by a schoolmaster. Another condition allowed them to work in the mines if they attended school for six hours per week (three hours twice a week).

It also improved safety rules. Miners were given the ability to select checkweighman, but mine owners were also given the ability to dismiss them.

Impact to further legislation
Checkweighman's positions were made secure with the Mine Regulation Act of 1872. From 1873, boys below the age of twelve were excluded from underground employment. Exemptions could be ordered by the Secretary of State for mines working thin seams.

Above ground work
There were regulations for above ground work for boys and girls. The minimum age for part-time work was 10 years of age, and 12 years of age for full-time work.

References
A Collection of the Public General Statutes passed in the Twenty-third and the Twenty-fourth Years of the Reign of Her Majesty Queen Victoria. Printed by George Edward Eyre and William Spottiswoode, Printers to the Queen's most Excellent Majesty. London. 1860. Pages 1389 to 1403.

United Kingdom Acts of Parliament 1860
Child labour
United Kingdom labour law
Health and safety in the United Kingdom
Children's rights in the United Kingdom